Kenneth "Trey" Murphy III (born June 18, 2000) is an American professional basketball player for the New Orleans Pelicans of the National Basketball Association (NBA). He played college basketball for the Rice Owls and the Virginia Cavaliers.

Early life and high school career
Murphy was born in Durham, North Carolina to his mother, Albeda, and father, Kenneth Murphy Jr.. He played high school basketball at Cary Academy in Cary, North Carolina, where, as a senior, he averaged 24.7 points and 7.4 rebounds per game while shooting 49.4% from the floor. He also shot 43.6% from beyond the three-point line and 85.8% from the free-throw stripe. On October 4, 2017, Murphy committed to playing college basketball for Rice.

College career

Rice
As a freshman, Murphy played in all 32 of Rice's games. He came off the bench 31 times and got to start one game, the first being against Charlotte in March 2019. He averaged 8.4 points and 2.6 rebounds. He ranked fourth in Conference USA (C-USA) in three-point field goal percentage (42.1%) and 14th in 3-pointers made per game (2.0). He also set the school freshman record for three-point field goal percentage (42.1%). On January 26, 2019, Murphy scored a career-high of 24 points and five 3-pointers while going a career-best 6-of-6 from the free-throw line against UAB. As a sophomore, Murphy played in 29 of 32 games for Rice. He started in 23 of those games while coming off the bench in six. He led the Owls in scoring with 13.7 points and recorded 25 double-figure scoring games with two double-doubles. He also led the team with six 20-point games.

Virginia
On March 30, 2020, Murphy entered the transfer portal, and on April 14, 2020, he transferred to Virginia. Cary, North Carolina, native, friend, and future teammate, Justin McKoy helped recruit him to Virginia. Due to COVID-19 affecting college basketball, Murphy did not have to sit out a year and was granted three years of immediate eligibility instead of two.

Coming off the bench, Murphy scored 21 points while shooting 7-of-9 from the field in the Cavaliers' season opener in Bubbleville. He made his first start against William & Mary in late December 2020 and started the remainder of the season. At this time, NBA scouts saw him as a top 45 draft prospect. As a junior, he averaged 11.3 points and 3.4 rebounds per game. After posting a highly efficient 50–40–90 season under Tony Bennett at Virginia, Murphy declared for the 2021 NBA draft while maintaining his college eligibility. On June 21, 2021, Murphy announced that he signed with an agent, forgoing his remaining eligibility with Virginia and ending his collegiate career.

Professional career

New Orleans Pelicans (2021–present) 
Murphy was selected with the 17th overall pick in the 2021 NBA draft by the Memphis Grizzlies, but was traded to the New Orleans Pelicans. On August 10, 2021, he signed his rookie scale contract with the Pelicans. On October 20, Murphy made his NBA debut,  recording six points and two assists in a 117–97 loss to the Philadelphia 76ers. wins, the Pelicans qualified for the postseason for the first time since 2018 and faced the Phoenix Suns during their first round series. Murphy made his playoff debut on April 17, recording six points, four rebounds and two assists in a 110–99 Game 1 loss. The Pelicans ended up losing the series in six games. During his rookie season, Murphy had multiple assignments to the Pelicans' G League affiliate, the Birmingham Squadron.

On February 5, 2023, Murphy scored a then season-high 30 points, alongside four rebounds and two assists, in a 136–104 win over the Sacramento Kings. In February 2023, Murphy was selected to participate in the Slam Dunk Contest at All Star Weekend in Salt Lake City, Utah. He made it to the final round, but was defeated by Mac McClung. On March 12, Murphy put up a season-high and career-high 41 points in a 127–110 win over the Portland Trail Blazers.

Career statistics

NBA

Regular season

|-
| style="text-align:left;"| 
| style="text-align:left;"| New Orleans
| 62 || 1 || 13.9 || .394 || .382 || .882 || 2.4 || .6 || .4 || .1 || 5.4
|- class="sortbottom"
| style="text-align:center;" colspan="2"| Career
| 62 || 1 || 13.9 || .394 || .382 || .882 || 2.4 || .6 || .4 || .1 || 5.4

Playoffs

|-
| style="text-align:left;"|2022
| style="text-align:left;"|New Orleans
| 6 || 0 || 20.0 || .409 || .474 || .800 || 2.5 || .5 || .5 || .2 || 5.2
|- class="sortbottom"
| style="text-align:center;" colspan="2"|Career
| 6 || 0 || 20.0 || .409 || .474 || .800 || 2.5 || .5 || .5 || .2 || 5.2

College

|-
| style="text-align:left;"| 2018–19
| style="text-align:left;"| Rice
| 32 || 2 || 20.6 || .442 || .421 || .725 || 2.6 || .7 || .5 || .5 || 8.4
|-
| style="text-align:left;"| 2019–20
| style="text-align:left;"| Rice
| 29 || 23 || 30.2 || .434 || .368 || .824 || 5.5 || 1.2 || .9 || .6 || 13.7
|-
| style="text-align:left;"| 2020–21
| style="text-align:left;"| Virginia
| 25 || 20 || 29.6 || .503 || .433 || .927 || 3.4 || 1.2 || .8 || .4 || 11.3
|- class="sortbottom"
| style="text-align:center;" colspan="2"| Career
| 86 || 45 || 26.4 || .455 || .401 || .819 || 3.8 || 1.0 || .7 || .5 || 11.0

Personal life
His father, Kenneth, played at East Carolina from 1986 to 1988. Murphy goes by "Trey" because his father goes by "Kenny" and his grandfather goes by "Ken".

References

External links
Virginia Cavaliers bio
Rice Owls bio

2000 births
Living people
American men's basketball players
Basketball players from North Carolina
Birmingham Squadron players
Memphis Grizzlies draft picks
New Orleans Pelicans players
Rice Owls men's basketball players
Shooting guards
Small forwards
Sportspeople from Durham, North Carolina
Virginia Cavaliers men's basketball players